Baileyville is an unincorporated community in Ogle County, Illinois, and is located west of Rockford.

The community was named after O. Bailey, a pioneer citizen.

Demographics

Gallery

References 

Unincorporated communities in Ogle County, Illinois
Unincorporated communities in Illinois